Robert Henry Seaton (9 October 1879 – 1969) was an English footballer who played at left-half for Burslem Port Vale at the turn of the 20th century.

Career
Seaton probably joined Football League Second Division club Burslem Port Vale in 1900. His debut at the Athletic Ground came in a 1–0 loss to Stockport County on 3 September 1900. He played regularly until he lost his place in December 1900 and was released at the end of the 1900–01 season.

Career statistics
Source:

References

1879 births
1969 deaths
Sportspeople from Burslem
English footballers
Association football midfielders
Port Vale F.C. players
English Football League players